The Point of It All is the fourth studio album by American singer Anthony Hamilton. It was released on December 16, 2008, by Mister's Music, So So Def Recordings, and Zomba. The album's production was handled by Hamilton himself along with Mark Batson, Kevin Wooten, Dre & Vidal, James "Big Jim" Wright and Salaam Remi, among others.

The album debuted at number 12 on the US Billboard 200 and at number three on the Top R&B/Hip-Hop Albums chart, selling 133,000 copies in its first week of release, the highest sales week of his career. Upon its release, The Point of It All received generally positive reviews from most music critics. As of May 2010, the album had sold over 519,000 copies in the United States and was certified gold by the Recording Industry Association of America (RIAA).

Singles
The album's lead single "Cool" featuring David Banner, and it peaked at number 74 on the US Billboard Hot 100 and at number 19 on the Hot R&B/Hip-Hop Songs chart.

Critical reception

The Point of It All received generally positive reviews from music critics. At Metacritic, which assigns a normalized rating out of 100 to reviews from mainstream publications, the album received an average score of 72, based on nine reviews. Mike Joseph of PopMatters viewed Hamilton as "an artist capable of filling the void created when Gerald LeVert and Luther Vandross passed away. The album's opening track, "The News", drew comparisons to past artists tackle on social issues. Andy Kellman of AllMusic stated the song is "as poignant as Curtis Mayfield's 'Pusherman' and Willie Hutch's 'Brothers Gonna Work It Out'". Edward Bowser of Soul in Stereo described it as "[s]ort of like a more hip 'What's Going On,' about constant drama on the news and the need for a savior."

Distinct praise was given to Hamilton's voice. Mike Joseph of PopMatters wrote, "His raspy tone has drawn comparisons to everyone from Bill Withers to Bobby Womack, ... he's proven himself to be one of the few current artists capable of sounding like an authentic throwback (as opposed to a pale facsimile) and completely contemporary at the same time." Andy Kellman of AllMusic wrote, "Vocally, Hamilton has never been as dynamic as he is on this song, switching between his grittily textured baritone and surprisingly effective upper register."

Track listing

Notes
  signifies a co-producer

Charts

Weekly charts

Year-end charts

Certifications

Notes

References

External links
 Album review at The Dallas Morning News

2007 albums
Albums produced by Dre & Vidal
Albums produced by Jack Splash
Albums produced by Mark Batson
Albums produced by Salaam Remi
Anthony Hamilton (musician) albums
So So Def Recordings albums
Zomba Group of Companies albums